Krista Mollee Griffith (born October 4, 1972) is an American politician. She is as a member of the Delaware House of Representatives, representing District 12.

Griffith was elected in the general election on November 6, 2018, winning 53 percent of the vote over incumbent Republican Deborah Hudson, who had been part of the Republican caucus leadership. Prior to her election, Griffith worked as a Deputy Attorney General in the Delaware Department of Justice.

References

External links
Official page at the Delaware General Assembly
Campaign site
 

1972 births
Living people
University of New Hampshire alumni
Suffolk University Law School alumni
Democratic Party members of the Delaware House of Representatives
Women state legislators in Delaware
21st-century American women politicians
21st-century American politicians